Gail Mandel is a senior scientist at the Vollum Institute and a professor in the Department of Biochemistry and Molecular Biology at Oregon Health & Science University. From 1997 to 2016 she was an investigator with Howard Hughes Medical Institute. In 2008 she was elected a member of the National Academy of Sciences.

In the department of neurobiology and behavior at Stony Brook University, she identified the protein REST, which is responsible for regulation of sodium channel expression and the acquisition of cellular excitability. These discoveries have helped unlock the mechanisms through which embryonic cell types differentiate specifically into neurons.

Research in the Mandel Lab is focused on understanding how neuronal cell identity is established and maintained. Most recently, the lab uncovered a role for glia in inducing neuronal dysfunction in Rett Syndrome, one of the most common causes of mental retardation in young girls.

References 

Living people
American scientists
Howard Hughes Medical Investigators
Oregon Health & Science University faculty
Year of birth missing (living people)